Magic City Memoirs is a 2011 American coming of age drama film directed by Aaron J. Salgado, and stars Natalie Martinez, Dominik Garcia-Lorido, Nestor Serrano, Julio Oscar Mechoso, J.R. Villarreal and Michael Cardelle. The film is based on the true stories from Salgado's adolescence.

The film takes place in Miami, Florida, and follows the story of three lifelong friends, from very different backgrounds, who are on the verge of high school graduation who indulge in reckless behavior that finds them on the brink of either their graduation or their mortality.

Synopsis
Magic City Memoirs follows the lives of three lifelong friends: Mikey Acosta, Angel and Stok. Mikey Acosta is a star high school baseball prospect, while Angel is a whiz of a student as well as the son of a prominent Miami politician. Stok is the son of an incarcerated drug lord. These three best friends attempt to navigate through their senior year amongst the pressures and temptations of the city.

Cast

 Natalie Martinez as Mari
 Dominik Garcia-Lorido as Veronica Suarez
 Nestor Serrano as Angel Suarez Sr.
 Julio Oscar Mechoso as Alejandro Acosta
 J.R. Villarreal as Mikey Acosta
 Michael Cardelle as Angel Suarez Jr.
 Andres Dominguez as Stok
 Jordi Vilasuso as Eric
 Granville Adams as Scout

Release
The film premiered at the Miami International Film Festival, where it won the Pursuit of Perfection Award.

Accolades

References

External links
 

2011 films
2010s coming-of-age drama films
2011 independent films
American coming-of-age drama films
Films shot in Miami
American independent films
2011 drama films
2010s English-language films
2010s American films